Kisbárkány is a village in Nógrád County, Hungary with 161 inhabitants (2014). The village is located in a narrow valley between the wooded hills of the Cserhát. The population is Hungarian but the village also has some homeowners from Western European countries. In the wide valley adjacent to Kisbárkány, at the end of a dead end road, lies Bedepuszta, a small hamlet used as event village for international events, like Sziget Detox/Sziget Retreat.

In WWII the Bede valley was playground for a battle between the Russian and German army. A monument to the fallen Russians can be found in Bedepuszta. 

Populated places in Nógrád County